WNCP-TV (formerly known as WPSU-TV) is the college television station for the University of North Carolina at Pembroke. It can be seen on Charter Spectrum Channel 6 in Robeson County.

Programming 
WNCP-TV offers various programming for its viewers.
Carolina News Today (formerly WNCP News) - A weekly, student produced news show that covers topics from campus events to national news. Airs live on Fridays at 10:30 a.m.
WNCP Sports - Live airings of the sports at the University of North Carolina at Pembroke. Currently includes wrestling and men & women's basketball games.
Academe Today - WNCP's eclectic, educational talk show hosted by Dr. Bruce Ezell of the UNCP Department of Biology.
Picture of Health - Ann Stephens discusses advances in health care at Southeastern Regional Medical Center.
Superintendent's Office - Produced by Public Schools of Robeson County.
RCC Today - What's new at Robeson Community College.

Podcasts/RSS Feeds 
Several shows are available as podcasts via iTunes, iPodder, or directly from WNCP-TV's Subscribe page.

Past Programming 

Trailer Trash - Comedic review of movie trailers and commentary on Hollywood, with a heavy emphasis on comedic skits involving recurring characters in later seasons. Co-produced by Matt Heckel and Andra Hale. Was the station's number one rated show during its three seasons.
Broadcast Now - 30 minute sitcom about what happens behind the scenes of a student ran TV news show. Produced, Written, and Directed by co-star Jules Forde. Due to its language, sexual humor, and depictions of drug and alcohol use, it was the most controversial show in WNCP-TV's history.
On the Come Up - Student-produced program, showcasing up and coming music artists.
Cafe Olé - Mature student produced comedy. Produced by Kyle Orozovich.
The Electric Monkey Factory - Student produced comedy show. (1991-1996)  Featuring skits and music videos.  First half-hour show of its type produced at WNCP-TV.  Founded by students Tripp Culbreth, Michael Joyner and John Field.
Unleashed - Student produced program, showcasing local bands and musicians (similar to MTV Unplugged)
One Mic - A stand-up comedy show showcasing local comedians. Produced by Andra Hale and Dennis Douglas Jr.

External links 
WNCP-TV website
Podcast/RSS Subscription page
Program Listing

Television stations in North Carolina
University of North Carolina at Pembroke